Kusarlapudi is a village in Anakapalli district of the Indian state of Andhra Pradesh. It is located in Rolugunta mandal of Narsipatnam revenue division.

References Ramesh  

Villages in Anakapalli district